Oceanobacter kriegii is a mesophilic bacterium from the genus of Oceanobacter which has been isolated from seawater from the United States.

References

Oceanospirillales
Bacteria described in 1984